VfL Kirchheim/Teck is a German association football club from the city of Kirchheim unter Teck, Baden-Württemberg. The football club is part of a larger sports club that has over 4,000 members in 18 departments that include Aikido, athletics, badminton, basketball, bowling, fencing, fistball, gymnastics, handball, Judo, Karate, swimming, table tennis, tennis, triathlon, and wrestling. The club also has sections for leisure sport, seniors, and rehabilitation.



History
The origins of the club go back to the establishment on 6 July 1881 of the gymnastics club Turnverein 1861 Kirchheim. A football department was formed within the association and in 1911 became independent as VfB Kirchheim. On 20 May 1933 the team merged with TSV 1861 Kirchheim to create Turn- und Sportvereinigung Kirchheim which was itself made up of the original parent club TV and TB 1888 Kirchheim 1922. This union was short-lived and broke up on 26 February 1935, only to be re-made in 1945 as VfL Kirchheim.

In 1941 the footballers took part in qualification play for the Gauliga Württemberg, one of sixteen top flight divisions established in the 1933 reorganization of German football under the Third Reich, but failed to advance after finishing second in their playoff pool. Following World War II the team played in the Amateurliga Württemberg (II) from 1946 to 1952 before slipping to lower-level competition for several decades. Kirchheim returned to the Amateurliga (IV) level in 1984–85 and the following season were promoted to the Oberliga Baden-Württemberg (III) where they earned mixed results until relegated for a single season in 1991–92. On their return to the Oberliga they played as a lower table side, failing to qualify for the new third division Regionalliga Süd formed in 1994 through restructuring of the country's football competitions. However, VfL later won its way into tier III play on the strength of an Oberliga Baden-Württemberg (IV) title in 1997. The club's turn at the Regionalliga level was unsuccessful, and they struggled over the following seasons, leading to demotion to the Verbandsliga Württemberg (V) in 2001. The club again returned to the Oberliga Württemberg (IV) following a Verbandsliga championship in 2007, but withdrew from the league in 2011, opting not to field a first team in 2011–12 and to return to the Verbandsliga Württemberg in 2012.

The club finished on a relegation rank in 2012–13 and dropped to the tier seven Landesliga for the following season, followed by another relegation in 2014, now to the Bezirksliga. After dropping down to the tier nine Kreisliga A in 2015 the club recovered and won the league, earning promotion back to the Bezirksliga.

Honours
The club's honours:

League
 Oberliga Baden-Württemberg (IV)
 Champions: 1997
 Verbandsliga Württemberg (V)
 Champions: 1986, 1992, 2007
 Landesliga Württemberg
 Champions: 1984

Cup
 Württemberg Cup
 Winners: 1961, 2003
 Runners-up: 1988, 1997

Stadium
The Sportgelände an der Jesinger Allee has five turf and one artificial turf football pitches. The spectator area at the main playing field can accommodate 10,000 (400 seats).

Recent managers
Recent managers of the club:

Recent seasons
The recent season-by-season performance of the club:

 With the introduction of the Regionalligas in 1994 and the 3. Liga in 2008 as the new third tier, below the 2. Bundesliga, all leagues below dropped one tier.

References

Sources
Grüne, Hardy (2001). Vereinslexikon. Kassel: AGON Sportverlag

External links

Official club website
Official football department website
Abseits Guide to German Soccer
Das deutsche Fußball-Archiv historical German domestic league tables (in German)
VfL Kirchheim/Teck profile at Weltfussball.de

Football clubs in Germany
Football clubs in Baden-Württemberg
Association football clubs established in 1881
1881 establishments in Germany